The chapters of  are written and illustrated by Matsuri Akino. The chapters were collected in ten bound volumes and published in Japan by Ohzora Publishing.


Volume list

Pet Shop of Horrors

Pet Shop of Horrors: Tokyo

References

External links
 

Pet Shop of Horrors